St Martin-in-the-Fields is a Church of England parish church at the north-east corner of Trafalgar Square in the City of Westminster, London. It is dedicated to Saint Martin of Tours. There has been a church on the site since at least the medieval period. It was at that time located in the farmlands and fields beyond the London wall, when it was awarded to Westminster Abbey for oversight.

It became a principal parish church west of the old City in the early modern period as Westminster's population grew. When its medieval and Jacobean structure was found to be near failure, the present building was constructed in an influential neoclassical design by James Gibbs in 1722–1726.  The church is one of the visual anchors adding to the open-urban space around Trafalgar Square.

History

Roman era
Excavations at the site in 2006 uncovered a grave from about A.D. 410. The site is outside the city limits of Roman London (as was the usual Roman practice for burials) but is particularly interesting for being so far outside (1.6 km or 1 statute mile west-south-west of Ludgate), and this is leading to a reappraisal of Westminster's importance at that time. The burial is thought by some to mark a Christian centre of that time (possibly reusing the site or building of a pagan temple).

Medieval and Tudor

The earliest extant reference to the church is from 1222, when there was a dispute between the Abbot of Westminster and the Bishop of London as to who had control over it. The Archbishop of Canterbury decided in favour of Westminster, and the monks of Westminster Abbey began to use it.

Henry VIII rebuilt the church in 1542 to keep plague victims in the area from having to pass through his Palace of Whitehall. At this time it was literally "in the fields", occupying an isolated position between the cities of Westminster and London.

Seventeenth century
By the beginning of the reign of James I, the local population had increased greatly and the congregation had outgrown the building. In 1606 the king granted an acre (405 m²) of ground to the west of St Martin's Lane for a new churchyard, and the building was enlarged eastwards over the old burial ground, increasing the length of the church by about half. At the same time, the church was, in the phrase of the time, thoroughly "repaired and beautified". Later in the 17th century, capacity was increased by the addition of galleries. The creation of the new parishes of St Anne, Soho, and St James, Piccadilly, and the opening of a chapel in Oxenden Street also relieved some of the pressure on space.

As it stood at the beginning of the 18th century, the church was built of brick, rendered over, with stone facings. The roof was tiled, and there was a stone tower, with buttresses. The ceiling was slightly arched, supported with what Edward Hatton described as "Pillars of the Tuscan and Modern Gothick orders".

A number of notables were buried in this phase of the church, including Robert Boyle, Nell Gwyn, John Parkinson and Sir John Birkenhead.

Rebuilding

A survey of 1710 found that the walls and roof were in a state of decay.  In 1720, Parliament passed an act for the rebuilding of the church allowing for a sum of up to £22,000, to be raised by a rate on the parishioners.  A temporary church was erected partly on the churchyard and partly on ground in Lancaster Court. Advertisements were placed in the newspapers that bodies and monuments of those buried in the  church or churchyard could be taken away for reinterment by relatives.

The rebuilding commissioners selected James Gibbs to design the new church. His first suggestion was for a church with a circular nave and domed ceiling, but the commissioners considered this scheme too expensive.  Gibbs then produced a simpler, rectilinear plan, which they accepted. The foundation stone was laid on 19 March 1722, and the last stone of the spire was placed into position in December 1724.  The total cost was £33,661 including the architect's fees.

The west front of St Martin's has a portico with a pediment supported by a giant order of Corinthian columns, six wide. The order is continued around the church by pilasters. In designing the church, Gibbs drew upon the works of Christopher Wren,  but departed from Wren's practice in his integration of the tower into the church. Rather than considering it as an adjunct to the main body of the building,  he constructed it within the west wall, so that it rises above the roof, immediately behind the portico, an arrangement also used at around the same time by John James at St George, Hanover Square (completed in 1724), although James' steeple is much less ambitious.

The church is rectangular in plan, with the five-bay nave divided from the aisles by arcades of Corinthian columns. There are galleries over both aisles and at the west end. The nave ceiling is a flattened barrel vault, divided into panels by ribs. The panels are decorated in stucco with cherubs, clouds, shells and scroll work, executed by Giuseppe Artari and Giovanni Bagutti.

Until the creation of Trafalgar Square in the 1820s, Gibbs's church was crowded by other buildings. J. P. Malcolm, writing in 1807, said that its west front "would have a grand effect if the execrable watch-house and sheds before it were removed" and described the sides of the church as "lost in courts, where houses approach them almost to contact".

The design was criticised widely at the time, but subsequently became extremely famous, being copied particularly widely in the United States. Although Gibbs was discreetly Catholic, his four-wall, long rectangular floor plan, with a triangular gable roof and a tall prominent centre-front steeple (and often, columned front-portico), became closely associated with Protestant church architecture world-wide.  In Britain, the design of the 1730s St Andrew's in the Square church in Glasgow was inspired by it. In India, St Andrew's Church, Egmore, Madras (now Chennai), is modelled on St Martin-in-the-Fields.  In South Africa, the Dutch Reformed Church in Cradock is modelled on St Martin-in-the-Fields.

Various notables were soon buried in the new church, including the émigré sculptor Louis-François Roubiliac (who had settled in this area of London) and the furniture-maker Thomas Chippendale (whose workshop was in the same street as the church, St Martin's Lane), along with Jack Sheppard in the adjoining churchyard. This churchyard, which lay to the south of the church, was removed to make way for Duncannon Street, constructed in the 19th century to provide access to the newly created Trafalgar Square. Two small parcels of the churchyard survived, to the north and east of the church. The Metropolitan Public Gardens Association laid them out for public use in 1887; unusually for the MPGA, it paved them with flagstones as well as planted them with trees. For many years covered in market stalls, the churchyard has been restored including with the provision of seating.

Before embarking for the Middle East Campaign, Edmund Allenby was met by General Beauvoir De Lisle at the Grosvenor Hotel and convinced General Allenby with Bible prophecies of the deliverance of Jerusalem. He told General Allenby that the Bible said that Jerusalem would be delivered in that very year, 1917, and by Great Britain. General Beauvoir de Lisle had studied the prophecies, as he was about to preach at St Martin-in-the-Fields.

Recent times

Because of its prominent position, St Martin-in-the-Fields is one of the most famous churches in London. Dick Sheppard, Vicar from 1914 to 1927 who began programmes for the area's homeless, coined its ethos as the "Church of the Ever Open Door". The church is famous for its work with young and homeless people through The Connection at St Martin-in-the-Fields, created in 2003 through the merger of two programmes dating at least to 1948.  The Connection shares with The Vicar's Relief Fund the money raised each year by the BBC Radio 4 Appeal's Christmas appeal.

The crypt houses a café which hosts jazz concerts whose profits support the programmes of the church. The crypt is also home to the London Brass Rubbing Centre, established in 1975 as an art gallery, book, and gift shop.  A life-sized marble statue of Henry Croft, London's first pearly king, was moved to the crypt in 2002 from its original site at St Pancras Cemetery.

In January 2006, work began on a £36-million renewal project. The project included renewing the church itself, as well as provision of facilities encompassing the church's crypt, a row of buildings to the north and some significant new underground spaces in between. The funding included a grant of £15.35 million from the Heritage Lottery Fund. The church and crypt reopened in the summer of 2008.

Its present vicar is Sam Wells (since 2012), who as well as a priest is a renowned theologian and writer.

Twelve historic bells from St Martin-in-the-Fields, cast 1725, are included in the peal of the Swan Bells tower in Perth, Australia.
The current set of twelve bells, cast in 1988, which replaced the old ones are rung every Sunday between 9am and 10am by the St Martin in the Fields Band of Bell Ringers. The bells are also rung by the Friends of Dorothy Society each year as part of London Pride.

In popular culture
Being in a prominent central London location, the exterior of the church building frequently appears in films, including Notting Hill and Enigma, and television programmes, including Doctor Who and Sherlock.

References to the church take place in the following novels:
1850 – David Copperfield by Charles Dickens
1908 – A Room with a View by E. M. Forster
1928 – The Last Post, the fourth and final novel in Ford Madox Ford's tetralogy Parade's End
1949 – Nineteen Eighty-Four by George Orwell (in which a future Totalitarian regime abolishes religion and turns the building into a military museum)  
1949 – The Parasites by Daphne du Maurier
2004 – Quicksilver by Neal Stephenson
2012 – Winter of the World by Ken Follett

References to the church occur in the following poems:

1893 – "The Kingdom of God" by Francis Thompson
2009 – "Now traveller, whose journey passes through" by Andrew Motion

The St Mary's Church in Pune is designed in the style of St Martin's.

The church may be the St Martin's referred to in the nursery rhyme known as Oranges and Lemons.

Royal connections
The church has a close relationship with the Royal Family, whose parish church it is, as well as with 10 Downing Street and the Admiralty.

Almshouses
The church established its own almhouses and pension-charity on 21 September 1886. The 19 church trustees administered almshouses for women and provided them with a weekly stipend.  The almshouses were built in 1818, in Bayham Street (to a design by Henry Hake Seward), on part of the parish burial ground in Camden Town and St Pancras and replaced those constructed in 1683.

Charity

The St Martin-in-the-Fields charity supports homeless and vulnerably housed people. The church has raised money for vulnerable people in its annual Christmas Appeal since 1920 and in an annual BBC radio broadcast since December 1927.

The Connection at St Martin's is located next to the church, and works closely with the church's charity. It supports 4000 homeless people in London each year, by providing accommodation, medical and dental care, skills training, and creative activities.

Vicars

1539: Edmund Watson  
1539: Robert Beste 
1554: Thomas Wells
1572: Robert Beste
1572: William Wells
1574: Thomas Langhorne
1574: William Ireland
1577: Christopher Hayward
1588: William Fisher
1591: Thomas Knight
1602: Thomas Mountford
1605-1611: Francis Marbury
1632: William Bray
1641: John Wincopp
1643: Thomas Strickland
1644–1648: Daniel Cawdry
1648: Gabriel Sangar
1661: Nicholas Hardy
1670: Thomas Lamplugh
1676: William Lloyd
1680: Thomas Tenison
1692: William Lancaster
1693: Nicholas Gouge
1694–1716: William Lancaster
1716–1723: Thomas Green
1723–1756: Zachariah Pearce
1756–1776: Erasmus Saunders
1776–1812: Anthony Hamilton
1812–1824: Joseph Holden Pott 
1824–1834: George Richards
1834–1848: Sir Henry Robert Dukinfield, Bart.
1848–1855: Henry Mackenzie
1855–1886: William Gilson Humphry
1886–1903: John Fenwick Kitto
1903–1914: Leonard Edmund Shelford
1914–1927: Hugh Richard Laurie Sheppard 
1927–1940: William Patrick Glyn McCormick
1941–1947: Eric Loveday
1948–1956: Lewis Mervyn Charles-Edwards
1956–1984: Austen Williams
1985–1995: Geoffrey Brown
1995–2011: Nicholas Holtam
2012–present: Samuel Wells

Music
The church is known for its regular lunchtime and evening concerts: many ensembles perform there, including the Academy of St Martin-in-the-Fields, which was co-founded by Sir Neville Marriner and John Churchill, a former Master of Music at St Martin's.

Organ
The organ is housed in the west gallery. The first organ to be installed in the new Gibbs church of 1726 was built by Christopher Schreider in 1727. The current instrument was built in 1990.

List of organists
Organists include:
John Weldon 1714–1736
Joseph Kelway 1736–1781 (formerly organist of St Michael, Cornhill)
Benjamin Cooke 1781–1793
Robert Cooke 1793–1814 (son of Benjamin Cooke)
Thomas Forbes Gerrard Walmisley 1814–1854
William Thomas Best 1852–1855?
W.H. Adams, appointed 1857
H.W.A. Beale
William John Kipps 1899–1924
Martin Shaw 1920–1924
Arnold Goldsborough 1924–1935
John Alden 1935–1938
Stanley Drummond Wolff 1938–1946
John Churchill 1949–1967
Eric Harrison  1967–1968
Robert Vincent 1968–1977 (later organist of Manchester Cathedral)
Christopher Stokes 1977–1989 (later Director of Music, St Margaret's Westminster Abbey and Organist & Master of the Choristers Manchester Cathedral)
Mark Stringer 1989–1996 (currently Director of Music, Wells Cathedral School, Wells UK, since April 2015; Executive Director Trinity College London, 1997–2012; sometime Director of Music, Methodist Central Hall, Westminster)
Paul Stubbings 1996–2001 (later Director of Music, St Mary's Music School, Edinburgh)
Nick Danks 2001–2008
Andrew Earis 2009 –

St Martin's school
In 1699 the church founded a school for poor and less fortunate boys, which later became a girls' school. It was originally sited in Charing Cross Road, near the church. At one time  it was known as St Martin's Middle Class School for Girls, and was later renamed St Martin-in-the-Fields High School for Girls. It was relocated to its present site in Lambeth in 1928.

The school badge depicts the eponymous Saint Martin of Tours. The school's Latin motto  translates as "With love and learning". The school is Christian but accepts girls of all faiths.

See also

Christ Child – sculpture (1999)
Academy of St Martin in the Fields
List of churches in London
Peter G. Dyson
St. George's Church, Dublin

Notes and references

External links

St Martin-in-the-Fields website
Connection at St Martin's website
Roman occupation of church site
Mystery Worshipper Report  at the Ship of Fools website
Deanery of Westminster (St Margaret)

Church of England church buildings in the City of Westminster
Churches completed in 1726
18th-century Church of England church buildings
Grade I listed churches in the City of Westminster
1726 establishments in Great Britain
Diocese of London
Rebuilt churches in the United Kingdom
Trafalgar Square
James Gibbs buildings
Georgian architecture in the City of Westminster
Greek Revival church buildings in the United Kingdom
Neoclassical architecture in London
Neoclassical church buildings in England